The New Hampshire Fisher Cats are a Minor League Baseball team based in Manchester, New Hampshire. The team, which plays in the Eastern League, is the Double-A affiliate of the Toronto Blue Jays major league club.

During the team's first season in Manchester, the Fisher Cats played at Gill Stadium, a historic ballpark in a residential neighborhood.  Starting with the 2005 season, the Fisher Cats have played at Delta Dental Stadium (originally known as Fisher Cats Ballpark, later as Merchantsauto.com Stadium, and previously as Northeast Delta Dental Stadium), which is located in Manchester and has a capacity of 6,500.

The Fisher Cats won the Eastern League championship in 2004, their first season in New Hampshire after moving the franchise from New Haven, Connecticut. They won their second Eastern League championship in 2011, their first season wearing their current red, white, and blue team color scheme. In 2018 the team won the championship again, this time for the first time at Northeast Delta Dental Stadium.

History

New Haven, Connecticut, along with Portland, Maine, was granted an expansion Double-A franchise on October 3, 1992. The new ballclub was named the New Haven Ravens in January 1993, the result of a contest sponsored by the New Haven Register, WELI and WTNH. The Ravens began play in the 1994 season affiliated with the Colorado Rockies.  The team hosted the 1998 Double-A All-Star Game, was league runner-up in 1995 and 2003, and won the Eastern League Championship in 2000 with an 82–60 record, defeating the Reading Phillies 3 games to 1 in the championship series.  The Ravens played in Yale Field.

The team was sold on January 27, 2003, to Lowell Spinners owner Drew Weber, with the intention of moving the franchise to Manchester, New Hampshire. The Eastern League baseball team owners voted to approve the move during the league playoffs later that same year on September 3. The team's first season in Manchester was 2004.  The first season was played at Gill Stadium southeast of the downtown area while the current ballpark was under construction.

On July 19, 2005, Drew Weber sold his controlling interest in the team.  Art Solomon became the new controlling owner with 60% ownership while Weber retained a 40% ownership share. On July 12, 2008, Solomon purchased full ownership of the Fisher Cats from Weber.

Gary Cathcart was named the team's new manager on December 3, 2007; Cathcart had served as the Fisher Cats' hitting coach during 2005 and 2006, and had most recently managed the single-A Lansing Lugnuts.

On July 16, 2008, the team hosted the 2008 Eastern League All-Star Game and Home Run Derby between the Northern Division and Southern Division. Travis Snider of the Fisher Cats won the Home Run Derby over Luis Montanez of the Bowie Baysox 7–6. In the All-Star Game itself, the Northern Division defeated the Southern Division 5–3 before a Northeast Delta Dental Stadium record crowd of 8,762.

On May 21, 2012, three Fisher Cats pitchers combined to throw the third no-hitter in franchise history, stifling the Portland Sea Dogs in a 6–0 victory at New Hampshire. Combining on the gem for the team were Brett Cecil (5⅔ innings), Danny Farquhar (2⅓), and Ronald Uviedo (1). It was the first no-hitter for New Hampshire since Kyle Drabek hurled a complete-game, nine-inning no-hitter against the New Britain Rock Cats on July 4, .

In conjunction with Major League Baseball's restructuring of Minor League Baseball in 2021, the Fisher Cats were organized into the Double-A Northeast. In 2022, the Double-A Northeast became known as the Eastern League, the name historically used by the regional circuit prior to the 2021 reorganization.

Origin of current team name

On November 6, 2003, the new management unveiled the New Hampshire Primaries name and logo, which featured an elephant and a donkey holding baseball bats, and was to be used starting in the 2004 season.  The management stated that they felt it reflected a unique aspect of the state, since the New Hampshire primary, held every four years, signifies the start of the Presidential election process. Immediately, the name and logo were widely criticized.  An online petition was created by two local baseball fans asking the team ownership to reconsider their decision and was covered by local newspapers, radio, and television stations.  This coverage was led by a front-page article in the New Hampshire Union Leader, New Hampshire's largest newspaper, on Sunday November 9, 2003.  By the afternoon of November 10, over 1200 unique visitors had signed the petition.  Later in the day, the team announced that they would not use the Primaries name after all and that they would seek public opinion on a new name.

On November 13, 2003, the team announced the "Name the Team" contest which had three phases over the following weeks.  During the first phase, fans submitted suggestions.  During the second phase, fans ranked their top five favorite names from the suggestions.  For the final phase, fans voted for their single favorite among the top five names from the second round.  On December 3, the final voting results were announced: New Hampshire Fisher Cats (1,574 votes – 24.5%), Manchester Millers (1,552 votes – 24.1%), Granite State Mountain Men (1,382 votes – 21.5%), New Hampshire Granite (1,302 votes – 20.2%), and New Hampshire Primaries (627 votes – 9.7%).  The ultimate source of the name is the fisher, often called a fisher cat in New Hampshire.  On January 22, 2004, the team unveiled the new set of logos that would be used for the name New Hampshire Fisher Cats.  All of the team's logos and fonts were created and designed by Studio Simon of Louisville, Kentucky.  Team colors were green, black, silver, and bronze.

On August 25, 2007, the Fisher Cats held a "turn back the clock" promotion and played as the New Hampshire Primaries against the Portland Sea Dogs.  The Primaries wore specially-designed game worn jerseys for the game.  This event would be repeated on July 4, 2008, for a game against the Trenton Thunder, and on July 4, 2009.

On November 28, 2007, the team unveiled a new logo, uniforms, and team colors that were designed by Rickabaugh Graphics of Gahanna, Ohio.  The official colors were emerald green, black, white, and silver.

On November 16, 2010, the team colors were changed to red, white and blue, with no other major changes to the logo and uniforms.

In 2021, Manchester's minor league baseball team announced it will briefly change its name from the New Hampshire Fisher Cats to the Manchester Chicken Tenders, referencing the city's role as the birthplace of the chicken tender.

Season-by-season
These statistics are current through the 2019 season.

Roster

See also 
 Professional baseball in Connecticut (for New Haven Ravens)

References

External links

 
 Statistics from Baseball-Reference

 
Baseball teams established in 1994
Eastern League (1938–present) teams
Sports in Manchester, New Hampshire
Professional baseball teams in New Hampshire
Toronto Blue Jays minor league affiliates
St. Louis Cardinals minor league affiliates
Colorado Rockies minor league affiliates
1994 establishments in Connecticut
Double-A Northeast teams